Sankt Wolfgang is a German municipality of the district of Erding (Bavaria).

Sankt Wolfgang may also refer to:

Wolfgang of Regensburg (Sankt Wolfgang), German Christian saint
St. Wolfgang im Salzkammergut, Austrian municipality of the district of Gmunden (Upper Austria)
Sankt Wolfgang-Kienberg, Austrian municipality in the district of Judenburg (Styria)

See also
Wolfgang (disambiguation)